Below is a list of broadcasts of Hanoi Radio Television Station (Hanoi TV).

HanoiTV1 

1 ngày khuyến mại
7 ngày mua sắm
7 nụ cười xuân
25 giờ khuyến mại
1000 độ hot
1000 năm Thăng Long - Hà Nội
1000 năm Thăng Long - ngàn năm vạn vật
Ai trúng số độc đắc - Have you got the balls 
An ninh thủ đô 
An toàn phòng cháy chữa cháy
Ẩm thực độc đáo
Asean +
Bác Hồ với thủ đô Hà Nội
Bản tin 141
Bản tin an toàn giao thông 
Bản tin an toàn thực phẩm 
Bản tin chiều
Bản tin chứng khoán và đầu tư
Bản tin cuối ngày
Bản tin giao thông đô thị 
Bản tin khoa học kỹ thuật 
Bản tin kinh tế 
Bản tin kinh tế cuối tuần 
Bản tin tài chính thị trường
Bản tin thế giới 
Bản tin Tiếng Anh
Bản tin Tiếng Trung
Bản tin văn hóa giao thông
Bạn có khỏe không
Bất động sản 
Bé yêu học ăn
Bé yêu làm bếp nhé
Bếp yêu thương
Bí ẩn của sắc màu
Bí mật đêm chủ nhật
Bí quyết khỏe đẹp
Bí quyết khỏe và đẹp
Bí quyết thành công
Bình luận vấn đề hôm nay
Biến hóa hoàn hảo
Biếng ăn không phải chuyện nhỏ
Bốn mùa yêu thương
Bóng đá Ngoại Hạng Anh
Bụng vui, bé khỏe, thông minh
Ca múa nhạc
Ca nhạc quốc tế
Ca sĩ bí ẩn
Các vấn đề văn hóa xã hội
Cẩm nang 365
Cẩm nang gia đình
Câu chuyện thương hiệu
Câu chuyện văn nghệ
Câu chuyện thời tiết
Cầu nối yêu thương 
Cây thuốc Việt
Chìa khóa tương lai
Chính sách và cuộc sống 
Chính sách thuế & cuộc sống 
Cho bé ngày mai
Cho tôi điều kỳ diệu 
Chơi chữ - Brainteaser
Con đường doanh nhân
Công nghệ & đời sống
Cuộc sống tiện ích 
Cuộc sống tươi đẹp
Cuộc sống xanh
Cười mười thang thuốc bổ
Chuyện phiếm
Chuyện phiếm cuối tuần
Chuyện phiếm tối thứ 3
Chuyện đô thị
Chuyện quanh ta
Chuyện tuổi già
Cơ hội 999 
Cơ hội chiến thắng 
Cửa sổ du học
Cuộc thi Người mẫu Châu Á
Dạ khúc tình yêu
Dạo quanh phố phường - Dạo qua thị trường
Dạy học trên truyền hình
Dạy ngoại ngữ cho trẻ em
Diễn đàn kinh tế
Diễn đàn thị trường
Doanh nhân thời hội nhập
Đấu giá cuối tuần
Đầu bếp vào nhà
Đại chiến kén rể
Đàn ông phải thế
Đẹp
Đẹp cùng sao
Đẹp & Phong cách
Địa chỉ bỏ túi
Địa chỉ từ thiện
Điểm báo
Điểm báo tuần
Đoàn kết là sức mạnh
Đuổi hình bắt chữ - Catchphrase 
EHome - Ngôi nhà điện tử
Gia đình tài tử
Gia đình trẻ
Giấc mơ có thật
Giải pháp dinh dưỡng dành cho người già
Giảm cân dễ dàng
Giáo dục & đào tạo
Giáo dục & hướng dẫn về Hà Nội học 
Giao thông cộng đồng
Giao thông vận tải
Giới thiệu văn bản pháp luật
Góc thư giãn
Gương mặt người mẫu Việt Nam 
Hà Nội 18:00
Hà Nội của chúng ta
Hà Nội đẹp và chưa đẹp
Hà Nội một tình yêu
Hà Nội ngày mai
Hà Nội ngàn năm văn hiến
Hà Nội những góc nhìn
Hà Nội vì trẻ em
Hà Nội với cả nước - Cả nước với Hà Nội
Hành trình kết nối những trái tim
Hàng Việt Nam
Hát cho ngày mai 
Hát theo băng hình 
Học tiếng Hàn qua nghệ thuật ẩm thực
Học viện IQ
Hội ngộ danh hài
Hộp đen - Black Box
Hugo và các bạn - Hugo!
Khám phá thế giới
Kết nối Việt Nam
Khi chàng vào bếp
Khoa học công nghệ và đời sống
Khoa học và công nghệ thông tin
Không gian tôi yêu
Không gian Việt
Không thỏa hiệp
Kiến thức gia đình
Kinh tế ngoại thành
Ký sự Hà Nội
Ký ức 60 năm Giải phóng Thủ đô
Kỳ phùng địch thủ
Khám phá Hà Nội
Khỏe & khéo
Không gian Việt
Khởi nghiệp
Lần theo dấu vết
Lá thư âm nhạc
Làm cha mẹ
Lắng nghe cơ thể bạn
Lắng nghe tiếng bé yêu
Lời yêu thương
Lựa chọn thông minh
Mã số bí mật  
Màn ảnh Thủ đô giới thiệu
Mẹ & bé
Mẹ tuyệt vời nhất
Miền quê văn hóa
Minh bạch thị trường Bất động sản
Món ngon mỗi ngày
Món ngon mỗi ngày
Môi trường & đô thị
Môi trường và tài nguyên
Một không gian văn hóa
Mua sắm thú vị
Nào, hãy mời tôi vào nhà - That's my Stuff 
Nối nhịp giao thông
Nốt nhạc ngôi sao
Ngày này năm xưa
Nghị quyết và cuộc sống
Ngoại thành đổi mới
Người bí ẩn
Người tiêu dùng thông thái
Người Tràng An - Người Hà Nội
Người Việt Nam ưu tiên dùng hàng Việt Nam
Người Việt dùng hàng Việt
Người tốt quanh ta
Nhanh như chớp
Nhà nông hội nhập
Nhà nông hiếu khách 
Nhà nước với công dân
Nhân vật & Sự kiện thể thao
Nhìn ra thủ đô và Đô thị các nước
Nhịp đập thể thao
Nhịp điệu ngày mới
Nhịp sống số 
Nhịp sống thủ đô
Những ẩn số vàng - Deal or No Deal 
Ống kính học đường 
Ống kính phóng viên
Pháp luật & cuộc sống
Phim truyện đặc sắc
Phim truyện Dành cho người hâm mộ
Phong cách & tiêu dùng
Phòng cháy chữa cháy
Phòng chống tội phạm
Phòng chống ung thư
Phổ biến và giáo dục pháp luật
Phụ nữ thời đại
Phụ nữ thủ đô
Phương tiện cuối tuần
Quà tặng thứ 7
Quê hương tôi đổi mới
Quản lý chất lượng an toàn thực phẩm
Rau an toàn với người tiêu dùng
Rồng bay
Sắc màu tuổi thơ
Sáng tạo & phát triển
Sáng tạo - Xã hội - Phát triển
Sau ánh hào quang
Shopping Block
Siêu hài nhí
Siêu sao đoán chữ
So tài cùng Sea Games 2003
Sống & làm việc theo pháp luật
Sống an toàn
Sống khỏe
Sống khỏe mỗi ngày
Sống như bạn muốn
Sức khỏe cộng đồng
Sức khỏe vàng
Tài chính thông minh
Tài năng Việt
Tài nguyên và môi trường
Tạp chí Đẹp
Tạp chí các vấn đề xã hội
Tạp chí kinh tế
Tạp chí thơ
Tạp chí tuổi học trò
Tâm điểm HanoiTV
Tâm điểm Hà Nội
Thời tiết du lịch
Thủ đô và thế giới 
Tiếng nói từ cơ sở
Tiêu dùng 360
Tiêu dùng thông minh
Tìm về nguồn cội
Tin và dùng
Tọa đàm thơ và nhạc
Tôi đẹp
Tôi là người chiến thắng
Tôi yêu Hà Nội 
Tự hào hàng Việt Nam
Thần tượng âm nhạc Việt Nam
Thanh niên thủ đô
Thay nhan sắc - đổi cuộc đời
Thế giới phương tiện
Thế giới phụ nữ
Thiên nhiên môi trường 
Thông tin đời sống
Thông tin thị trường
Thông tin tiêu dùng
Thời sự HanoiTV (18h30)
Dự báo thời tiết
Bản tin thể thao
Thơ về Hà Nội
Thời trang & Phong cách
Thời trang & Đam mê
Thủ đô & Thế giới
Thư & trả lời bạn xem truyền hình
Thử thách cùng bước nhảy
Thử thách lớn khôn 
Thuốc cho cuộc sống
Thương hiệu mạnh
Thường thức trong gia đình
Tiết kiệm năng lượng
Tiếng Hàn qua nghệ thuật ẩm thực 
Tình khúc giao mùa
Tình yêu đất Việt
Tôi tuổi teen
Trang văn học nghệ thuật
Trên đường hội nhập
Tri thức con người xưa và nay
Trò chuyện với người chưa ngủ
Trước ngưỡng cửa lập nghiệp
Truyền hình quốc phòng Thủ Đô
Tuyệt đỉnh tranh tài
Vào bếp cuối tuần
Văn hóa sống 
Văn hóa sự kiện
Văn nghệ cuối tuần
Vấn đề kinh tế
Vấn đề và dư luận
Vệ sinh an tòa thực phẩm
Vì an ninh thù đô
Vì cuộc sống tốt đẹp
Vì cuộc sống tươi đẹp
Vì lợi ích người tiêu dùng
Vì sức khỏe cộng đồng
Vì thủ đô xanh - sạch - đẹp
Vì trẻ em
Vitamin
Vòng quanh thế giới
Vũ điệu tuổi xanh
Vui cùng nghệ sỹ
Vượt qua thử thách - The Vault
Xả xì choét
Xây dựng nông thôn mới
Xây dựng thủ đô & đất nước
Xem là thích 
Xóm hóm

Hanoi TV2

Thử thách may mắn
Sắc màu cuộc sống
Chuyện quanh ta
Tư vấn tiêu dùng 
Góc thư giãn
Làm đẹp từ thiên nhiên
Cuộc sống tươi đẹp
Lao động - việc làm
Khám phá Việt 
Lựa và chọn 
Sức khỏe - khoa học - đời sống 
Truyền hình An ninh
Gia đình - nhà trường - xã hội 
Đảng trong cuộc sống
Khỏe đẹp 24h
Trang ngoại thành
Thông tin nông nghiệp
Nhịp sống nông thôn
Tài chính tiền tệ
Kinh tế du lịch
Chính sách thuế và cuộc sống 
Diễn đàn thị trường 
Cười từ nhà ra phố 
Thủ đô ra thế giới
Vòng quanh thế giới
Du lịch công nghiệp
Công nghiệp thương mại
Diễn đàn thị trường 
Sứ giả ngàn năm
Thế giới nghệ thuật
Thế giới động vật
Chuyện quanh ta
Thế giới thể thao
Sức khỏe cộng đồng
Nhớ lời Bác dạy
Tiểu luận du lịch
Xin chào bé yêu

HaTay TV

Thông điệp tình yêu 
Văn hóa và cuộc sống 
Văn hóa xã hội và du lịch
Rồng vàng
Không gian sống
Sức khoẻ khoa học và đời sống
Thời sự
Tài nguyên môi trường với cuộc sống 
Dành cho thiếu nhi
Người trong cuộc
Những nốt nhạc vui 
Thế giới quanh ta
Chuyện bốn phương 
Lực lượng vũ trang Hà Tây
Giao lưu văn hóa văn nghệ
Chương trình mua sắm 
Điểm tin chứng khoán
Tư vấn tiêu dùng
Không gian sống 
Tin học ứng dụng 
Nhịp nối trái tim
Pháp luật và cuộc sống 
Nốt nhạc vui

HcATV
Văn hóa du lịch

Hanoicab

HiTV
Hà Nội ngày mới
E Market
Chuyển động số
Đẹp hơn mỗi ngày
Kinh tế toàn cảnh
Văn hóa bốn phương 
Những người nổi tiếng
Cách tạo ra đồ vật
Những miền đất Việt
Công nghệ cuộc sống
Cơ hội vàng 
Phong thủy nhà ở

YouTV + TVM
Nick & You
Nhịp sống thị trường 
Bản tin kinh tế thị trường
Cùng hát cùng chơi
Phát lại các chương trình của VTC7 - Today TV

An Ninh Thế giới
Hồ sơ hình sự quốc tế
Vấn nạn toàn cầu
Chuyện đông chuyện tây
Camera giấu kín
Việt Nam và thế giới 
Hiểm họa Trái Đất

STTV
Bản tin văn hóa du lịch

MOV
Phim truyện

Hanoi Cab5

Phim Hay
Phim truyện

Radio

90.0 Mhz
Thời sự Hà Nội (6h, 11h, 19h)
Hà Nội - cao điểm (Sáng, Trưa, Chiều)
Radio 4 teen
Tình yêu Hà Nội
FM Du lịch
Tạp chí Văn học - nghệ thuật thủ đô
Sức khỏe là trên hết
Thế giới mạng
Kỹ năng sống
Giai điệu tâm tình
Khúc hát quê hương
Ca khúc chủ đề
Ca nhạc quốc tế
Di sản âm nhạc thế giới
Con đường nghệ thuật
Đọc truyện đêm khuya
Sóng trẻ
Thức dậy Hà Nội
60 phút bạn và tôi
FM tình yêu

96.0 Mhz
Chuyển động Hà Nội (Sáng, Trưa, Chiều)
Nhịp sống đô thị
Sống khỏe mỗi ngày
Thông tin kinh tế
Vệ sinh an toàn thực phẩm
Văn nghệ thiếu nhi

Joy 365 FM

See also
Hanoi Radio Television
List of programmes broadcast by Vietnam Television
List of television programme broadcast by HTV
List of television programmes broadcast by Vinh Long TV (THVL)

References

Vietnam
Original programming by Vietnamese television network or channel